This is the main list of dances.  It is a non-categorized, index list of specific dances.  It may also include dances which could either be considered specific dances or a family of related dances.  For example, ballet, ballroom dance and folk dance can be single dance styles or families of related dances.

See following for categorized lists:
 List of dance style categories
 List of ethnic, regional, and folk dances by origin
 List of national dances
Categories listed on these specialized (categorized) lists should also be included in this general index.

A 

 Abayı
 Abbots Bromley Horn Dance
 Acharuli (Georgian folk dance)
 Acro dance
 Adana
 Adowa dance
 Affranchi (Haiti)
 Agbadza
 Agir Karadagi1
 Ai Georgis
 Alanta dance
 Alkayida
 Allemande
 An Dro
 Angaliastos
 Angama (from Japan's Yaeyama Islands)
 Angelica
 Antikristos
 Antipatitis
 'Aparima
 Apu Inka
 Arab dance
 Aragonaise
 Arcan
 Ardah (Arab tribal war dance)
 Argentine Tango
 Arkan (Ukrainian, Hutsul)
 Armenian line dance
 Asma kasma
 Assiko
 Assyrian folk dance (Assyrian folk dances)
 Asyik
 Atilogwu
 Atsiapat
 Attan (Pashtun)
 Awki awki
 Azonto (Ghanaian dance)

B 

 Baagh Naach
 Bacchu-ber
 Bachata (Dominican Republic, Latin Club, Folk)
 Bachatango
 Baagh Naach (Folk dance from Odisha, India)
 Bagurumba (Folk dance of Assam, North-east India)
 Baile de la Conquista
 Baishou Dance
 Bajidor Kahot
 Bal-musette
 Baladi
 Balboa (Swing)
 Ball dels Cossiers
 Ballet
 Ballo
 Ballos (Burçak tarlası oyunu) (Greece), (Turkey)
 Ballroom dance
 Ballu tundu (Sardinia)
 Bamboula
 Bandari dance
 Bar
 Barachum
 Bardo Chham (Folk dance of Arunachal, North-east India)
 Baris
 Barn dance
 Baroque dance
 Barynya (Russian, folk)
 Basse danse (also Basse-dance, Bassadanse,Bassadanze. French and Italian Renaissance dances)
 Basque dance
 Batuque
 BBoying (Breakdance)
 Bear Dance
 Béarnaise dance
 Bedara Vesha
 Bedhaya
 Bélé
 Belly dance
 Beguine, dance of Caribbean origin
 Berd
 Bereznianka
 Bergamask (Be dance, from Bergamo, Italy
 Bhagavata Mela
 Bhairab Naach
 Bhangra (Folk Dance of Northern India)
 Bharatanatyam (Indian classical dance)
 Big Apple (Line dance)
 Bihu dance (Folk dance of Assam, India)
 Binasuan
 Biyelgee (Mongolian)
 Bizhu dance
 Black Bottom (see Lindy Hop)
 Blues (Club dance, Swing)
 Bolero (American Ballroom, Cuban, European)
 Bollywood (Indian)
 Bomba (Ecuador)
 Bomba (Puerto Rico) (African, Caribbean)
 Bon Odori (Japanese)
 Bondar
 Boogaloo
 Boogie-woogie (Swing)
 Borborbor
 Border Morris
 Borrowdale (Zimbabweean, see Museve music)
 Bossa nova (Brazil, see Bossa nova music)
 Boston
 Walking Boston
 Bourrée (historical)
 Branle (Bransle) (historical)
 Brazilian Zouk
 Breakaway (see Lindy Hop)
 Breakdancing
 Breton dance
 Buchaechum
 Bugaku
 Bugg (a swing dance from Sweden)
 Bump
 Bunny Hop
 Burlesque dance
 Buta Kola 
 Butoh (Japanese)
 Butterfly dance (American contemporary)
 Buyō (Japanese)
 Byeongsin chum
 Bygdedans

C 

 Cabbage Patch
 Cachucha
 Cajun dance (Louisiana, United States Regional, Cajun)
 Cajun Jig or Cajun One Step
 Cajun Jitterbug and Two Step
 Cakalele
 Cakewalk (Swing)
 Calabrian Tarantella
 Calypso (Caribbean)
 Can-can (Cancan, can can)
 Canaries dance (historical, Renaissance, court)
 Candle dance
 Candombe (Uruguayan)
 Capoeira (dance and martial art, Brazil)
 Caporales (Bolivia)
 Carabinier (Haiti)
 Carimbó
 Cariñosa (dance of love) Philippines
 Carioca
 Carnavalito
 Carpaea
 Castle Walk
 Cat Daddy
 Căluş (Romanian ritual dance)
 Ceili dance
 Cendrawasih
 Ceroc (Modern Jive, Club)
 Chaabi (Moroccan Berber dance)
 Chacarera (Argentina)
 Cha cha cha or Cha cha (Cuba, Latin Ballroom Social)
 Chaconne
 Chaiti ghoda dance
 Chakacha
 Chakkirako
 Chamamé (Argentina, Brazil, Paraguay)
 Chang Lo
 Chapelloise
 Charikawi
 Charkula
 Charleston
 Chasapiko  (Greece)
 Cheoyongmu
 Cheraw dance
 Chicken Dance
 Chicken Noodle Soup
 Chhau dance (Folk dance of Odisha, India)
 Chhayam
 Chholiya
 Choobazi
 Choreia
 Chukano horo
 Chukchu
 Ch'unchu
 Chula (Southern Brasil)
 Chumak
 Chumba (Garifuna people in several Central America)
 Chunaengjeon
 Cibi
 Cilveloy
 Cinquepace, Cinque-pace
 Circassian Dance
 Circle dance
 Cirebon mask dance (Java, Indonesia)
 Clog dance (British)
 Clogging
 Clowning
 Clutha
 Cocek
 Cocolo
 Collegiate shag
 Compas (Haiti, Guadeloupe, Martinique)
 Condong
 Conga
 Contact improvisation
 Contemporary dance
 Contra dance
 Cordax Greek / Roman erotic dance
 Cornish dance
 Corridinho
 Corrido
 Cossack dance
 Cotillion
 Country/western dance
 Country dance
 Country/Western Two-step
 Coupé-décalé
 Courante (historical)
 Court dance
 Crip walk
 Crnogorka (dance)
 Crpi voda, Jano
 Csárdás (Folk, Hungarian; also variants in Slovak dances, Rusyn dances, (Ukrainian dances, Lemko dances))
 Cuarteto (Argentina)
 Cuban rumba
 Cuban salsa
 Cueca (Argentina, Bolivia, Chile)
 Cumbia (Colombia, Club)
 Cumbia Villera (Argentina)
 Cupid Shuffle

D 

 Dab (America)
 Dabke (Arab folk dance native to the Levant)
 Dalkhai (Folk dance from Western Odisha, India)
 Dance of Osman Taka
 Dancer's Delight (Scottish)
 Dances of Universal Peace
 Danda nata (Folk dance from Odisha, India)
 Dandia (Folk dance of Gujarat, India)
 Dandiya Raas
 Danza de los Viejitos
 Danza de los Voladores
 Danza de tijeras (Peru)
 Danzantes de Levanto
 Danzón
 Dappan koothu
 Dashing White Sergeant
 Daychovo horo
 Deer dance
 Deknni
 Deodhani dance
 Devil's Sword Dance
 Dhaanto
 Dhalo (from Goa, éIndia)
 Dhamail or Dhamal (from Sylhet, Bangladesh)
 Dhimsa
 Diablada (Bolivia, Chile, Peru)Dab
 Dilan (a Kurdish dance, Iran, Turkey, Iraq)
 Dipat
 Diplos horos
 Dirk dance
 Disco
 Discofox
 Djolé
 Dollu Kunitha
 Domkach
 Domni
 Double bugg (a swing dance from Sweden)
 Dougie
 Dragon dance
 Duke of Perth
 Dumhal
 Dunhuang dance
 Duranguense
 Dutty Wine - a West Indian, Dancehall-inspired dance

E 

 Earsdon Sword Dance
 East Coast Swing
 Écossaise
 Ecstatic dance
 Egg dance
 Eisa
 Electro dance
 Electric Slide
 Endeka Kozanis
 English Country Dance
 Entarisi ala benziyor
 Errenzhuan
 Eskista
 Espringale
 Etighi

F 

 Fa'ataupati
 Fan dance (Chinese or burlesque)
 Fandango (Spain)
 Fanga
 Farandole (Provençal)
 Faroese dance
 Farruca
 Festejo
 Fisounis
 Flamenco (Spanish/Roma)
 Floss (Western)
 Folk dance
 Formation dance
 Forró (dance from northeast of Brazil)
 Foxtrot (Ballroom Social)
 Freak dancing
 The Freddy
 Frevo
 Frug
 Freestyle
 Fugdi
 Funaná
 Furiant
 Furlana

G 

 Gainjeonmokdan
 Gair dance
 Gaitanaki
 Galliard
 Galop
 Gambuh
 Gammaldans
 Gandrung
 Ganggangsullae
 Gankino (Bulgaria)
 Gangnam Style
 Gankino horo
 Ganggangsullae
 Garadi
 Garba (folk dance of state of Gujarat, India)
 Garland dance
 Gato (Argentina, Uruguay)
 Gaudiya Nritya (West Bengal, India)
 Gaur Maria Dance
 Gavotte (Brittany), Gavot (historical)
 Gay Gordons
 Gending Sriwijaya
 Geommu
 Gerontikos
 Ghoomar (Folk Dance of Rajasthan, Northern India)
 Ghumura Dance (Folk dance of Kalahandi, Orissa/Odisha, India).
 Giddha (Folk dance of Northern India)
 Gigue
 Giknas
 Gluvo-nemo
 Gombey (Bermuda)
 Gombhira
 Goravara Kunitha
 Goria dance
 Goseong ogwangdae
 Gotipua (Odisha, India) 
 Grancharsko horo
 Grida dance
 Grinding
 Grizzly Bear
 Guaguancó
 Guapacha
 Gumboot dance (Africa)
 Gusharaveli

H 

 Hacha'a
 Hai-hak dance
 Haka
 Hakken (Dutch)
 Halay (Turkish, Folk)
 Halling
 Hambo (Scandinavian, Folk)
 Hand jive
 Hardcore Dancing (Urban American Hardcore)
 Harlem Shake
 Hasapiko (Greece)
 Hatzichristos
 Headbanging
 Highland dancing
 Hip hop dance
 Hiragasy
 Historical dance
 Hitch hike
 Hivinau
 Hoedown
 Hojagiri
 Hokey Pokey, also known as Hokey-cokey, Okey-cokey
 Holubka
 Hootchy-Kootchy
 Hopak (Ukrainian)
 Hopak-Kolom
 Hop-tu-Naa
 Hora (many named versions; folk, Bulgarian, Israeli, Romanian, Ukrainian)
 Horon (Turkish, Folk)
 Hornpipe (Ireland)
 House dance
 Huaconada
 Huapango
 Huayno (Peru)
 Hula
 Hulivesha
 Hully Gully
 Humppa (see Music of Finland)
 Hunguhungu
 Hustle and its variant, New York Hustle (Club)
 Latin Hustle
 Hutsulka
 Hyporchema

I 

 Ikariotikos  (Greece)
 Improv Tribal Style Belly Dance
 Indlamu
 Innaby
 Intercessory dance
 International folk dance
 Interpretive dance
 Irish dance
 Irish Sean-Nós Dance
 Irish Stepdance
 Isios
 Isos Sinasos
 Israeli folk dancing

J 

 Ja'i
 Janger
 Jangi
 Jarabe tapatío
 Jarana yucateca
 Java
 Jazz dance
 Jenkka
 Jerkin'
 Jhijhiya
 Jhum dance
 Jhumair 
 Jhumar
 Jig Ireland
 Jig (Scottish country)
 Jitterbug (Swing)
 Cajun Jitterbug
 Jitterbug Stroll (Line dance, Swing)
 Jive (Ballroom, International Latin)
 Joged (Indonesian)
 Joget
 John Wall dance
 Jookin
 Jota (Spanish dance)
 Jove Malaj Mome (Bulgarian folk dance)
 Juego de maní
 Jumpstyle (Techno based dance)

K 

 Kabasaran
 Kachāshī (Okinawa, Japan)
 Kakilambe
 Kalamatianos (Greece)
 Kalbelia
 Kalikapatadi
 Kalymnikos  (Greece)
 Kamarinskaya (Russia)
 Kamilierikos
 Kamrupi dance
 Kancet Papatai
 Kanella
 Kangeli
 Kangilu
 Kaosikii dance
 Kapitan Louka
 Karakattam
 Karana
 Karikázó
 Karma Naach
 Karsilamas 
 Entarisi ala benziyor 
 Kastorianos
 Kaşık Havası
 Kathak (Classical Indian dance)
 Kathakali (India, incorporates dance)
 Katsabadianos
 Kebyar duduk
 Kecak
 Kechagiadikos
 Keisabadi (Folk dance from Odisha, India)
 Kenshibu
 Kerala Natanam (Indian dance created by Guru Gopinath)
 Kerkiraikos
 Khaleegy
 Khanchobany
 Khasapiko  (Greece)
 Khattak Dance (Pashtun)
 Khigga (Assyrian folk dance)
 Khon (Thai dance)
 Khorovod (Russia)
 Khorumi
 Kikkli
 Kinigitos
 Kizomba (Angola)
 Kleistos (Greece)
 Klezmer (Israeli Jewish)
 Klompendansen (Dutch)
 Kochari
 Koftos  (Greece)
 Kolannalu
 Kolata
 Kolbasti (Turkey)
 Kolo (Slavic)
 Kolomyjka (Ukrainian)
 Kontradans (Haiti)
 Kopačka
 Kopanitsa (Bulgaria)
 Körtánc
 Kotsari or Kochari (Laz: Koçari)
 Koutsos
 Kōwakamai
 Kozachok (Ukrainian)
 Kpanlogo
 Krakowiak (Poland)
 Krishnanattam (India)
 Kromanti dance
 Krumping
 Kuchipudi (Classical Indian dance)
 Kuda Lumping
 Kuduro
 Kujawiak (Poland)
 Kullawada
 Kumi Odori
 Kumina 
 Kummi
 Kurdish dance (Iran and Iraq)
 Kwassa kwassa

L 

 Lafina
 Lahasua
 Lakalaka
 Lambada
 Lambeth Walk
 Lambri Kamara
 Lap dance
 Lasya
 Latin dance
 Lavani (Indian, Maharashtra)
 Ländler (Austria)
 Lebang Boomani dance
 Legényes
 Legong
 Lerikos (Greece)
 LeRoc (Modern Jive, Ceroc)
 Les Lanciers
 Letkajenkka (also known as Letkis, Letkajenka, Letkiss, Letka-Enka, Let's Kiss Jenka, La Yenka)
 Leventikos (Greece)
 Lezginka (Russian Caucasus Region)
 Lezim
 Likok Pulo
 Limbo (dancers pass under horizontal pole)
 Linđo
 Lindy Hop (Swing)
 Line dance
 Lion dance
 Lipothymiarikos
 Liscio (Italian traditional music and dance inspired to Waltz, Polka and Mazurka)
 Llamerada
 Locking
 Long Sword
 Loulouvikos
 Loure (historical)
 Lurish dance (Iran and Iraq)
 Lyrical dance

M 

 Maanch
 Macarena (Spain)
 Maculelê
 Madison (Line dance)
 Maglalatik (Folk Dance of Philippines)
 Mahari dance
 Mak Inang
 Makedonia
 Makedonikos antikristos
 Makrinitsa dance
 Mak Sa'moa
 Mako
 Malaguena
 Malhão
 Malwai Giddha
 Mambo (American Ballroom, of Cuban origin)
 Mamita
 Mandilatos
 Maniatikos
 Manipuri (Classical Indian Dance)
 Mapalé
 Mapouka
 Mardana Jhumair
 Marinera (Peru)
 Mascherata
 Mashed Potato
 Masque
 Matachin (Matachines)
 Matki dance
 Māʻuluʻulu
 Maypole dance
 Maxixe (Social)
 Mazur (dance) (Poland)
 Mazurka (Poland)
 Mchogoro (Mayotte)
 Medieval dance
 Meʻetuʻupaki
 Meke
 Melbourne Shuffle (Australia)
 Menora
 Merengue (Latin Club)
 Méringue (Haiti)
 Metelytsia ((Ukrainian), khorovod)
 Metsovitikos
 Mihanikos
 Milonga (see Argentine Tango)
 Minuet
 Mirzayi
 Mixer dance
 Mizmar
 Modern dance
 Modern Jive
 Mohiniyattam (Indian classical dance)
 Molly dance
 Monferrina
 Monodiplos
 Moonwalker
 Moraego
 Morenada (Bolivia)
 Moresca
 Moreška
 Morris dance
 Mosak sulmani dance
 Moshing
 Mpougatsas
 Mugo
 Muiñeira (Galicia, Spain)
 Mujra
 Mule
 Murga (Argentina, Uruguay, Spain)
 Mussoll
 Mwanzele

N 

 Nabichum
 Nacnī (Folk dance from Odisha/Orissa)
 Namgen
 Napoloni
 Nati
 Newa dance
 New Vogue
 Niiko
 Nijemo Kolo
 Nizamikos
 Novelty and fad dances
 Ntames
 Ntournerakia
 Nutbush

O 

 O Nikolos
 Oberek (also called Obertas or Ober, Poland)
 Odissi  Orissi (Odisha, India)
 Odzemek
 Ohafia War Dance
 Ohangla dance
 Ojapali (folk dance from Assam, India)
 Okayama
 Okumkpa
 Oleg
 Omal
 One-Step
 Oro (eagle dance)
 Oruro Diablada
 'ote'a
 ʻotuhaka
 Owa dance

P 

 P'aquchi
 Pa'o'a
 Pachanga
 Padayani
 Padhar dance
 Pagode
 Paidushko horo
 Pakurumo
 Palamakia
 Palo de Mayo (Nicaragua), Afro-Caribbean influence, not to be confused with Maypole dance
 Pambiche
 Pandanggo
 Pangalay
 Panthi (Folk dance of Chhattisgarh, India)
 Pantsula (South Africa)
 Panyembrama
 Para Para
 Parai Attam
 Partalos
 Participation dance
 Partner dance
 Passacaglia (Passacaille) (historical)
 Passepied  (historical)
 Pasillo
 Pasodoble (Spanish Ballroom, International Latin)
 Pavane (historical)
 Pavri Nach
 Peabody (ballroom)
 Peacock dance
 Peewee style (originated by Pee-wee Herman in Pee-wee's Big Adventure)
 Pembe
 Pendet
 Pentozali  (Greece)
 Perini Shivatandavam
 Perinița
 Perkhuli
 Persian dance (Iran)
 Petrunino Horo
 Phulpati dance
 Pidikhtos  (Greece)
 Pilioritikos
 Pirgousikos
 Piva
 Pizzica
 Plataniotiko Nero
 Plena
 Poco-poco
 Podaraki
 Pogo (A punk dance, consisting of jumping up and down)
 Pogonishte
 Pole dancing
 Polka - many named versions (Ballroom, Folk, Historical)
 Polka-mazurka
 Polonaise
 Pols (Norway, Folk, see Polska)
 Polska (pl.: Polskor; Sweden, Folk)
 Pom Squad
 Pony
 Popping
 Pop, Lock, and Drop It (Hip hop dance)
 Potrčulka
 Poustseno
 Povrateno
 Pravo
 Prophetic dance
 Proskinitos
 Pryvit (Ukrainian)
 Puliyattam
 Pung cholom
 Punta (Honduras)
 Pyrrhichios (Dance from Pontos; Greek Black Sea)

Q 
 Qhapaq Qulla
 Quadrille
 Queer Tango
 Quickstep (Ballroom)
 Quebradita (Mexico)

R 

 Raas
 Raibenshe
 Rain dancing
 Ramvong (Cambodia)
 Rapper sword
 Raqs sharqi
 La Raspa
 Raut Nacha (Folk dance of Chhattisgarh, India)
 Rebetiko dances  (Greece)
 Red River Jig (Canadian Métis)
 Redowa
 Reel (Irish and Scottish)
 Regency dance
 Reggada
 Rejang dance
 Renaissance dance
 Reog
 Rhumba (a.k.a. ballroom rumba; International Latin & American Rhythm)
 Cuban rumba (Cuba)
 Rigaudon
 Rinkafadda
 Robam Meh Ambao
 Robam Neary Chea Chuor
 Robam Tep Apsara
 Robot dance
Rock and Roll
 Acrobatic Rock'n'Roll
 Rodat
 Roger de Coverley
 Rom kbach
 Romvong
 Ronggeng
 Round dance (two kinds: circular chain, couples)
 Rougatsiarikos
 Rudl
 Rugovo

S 

 Sadi Moma
 Sagayan
 Salegy
 Salsa (Latin Club)
 Salsa Rueda (Latin Club, Round)
 Saltarello
 Saman
 Samba
Samba de Gafieira
 Samba (ballroom dance)
 Sambai
 Sammi
 Sanding
 Sanghyang
 Sangini
 Sangrai dance
 Sapera
 Sarabande (Saraband)
 Sârbă
 Sardana (Catalonia)
 Sattriya dance (Assam, India)
 Schottische
 Schuhplattler
 Scottish country dance
 Scottish highland dance
 Sean-Nós Dance (Ireland - Irish Dance in Sean Nós "Old Style")
 Seann Triubhas
 Seguidilla  (Spanish, folk)
 Semba (Angola)
 Sequence dance
 Serpent dance
 Serra  (Greece)
 Set Dance Ireland
 Seungjeonmu
 Seungmu
 Sevillanas (Spain)
 Sewang dance
 Shag (Swing)
 Carolina shag
 Collegiate shag
 St. Louis shag
 Shake
 Shalakho
 Shim Sham (Line dance)
 Shimmy
 Shota
 Sianos
 Siklla
 Simd
 Simeriani
 Singhi Chham
 Singkil
 Single Swing (Single Time Swing)
 Singo Ulung
 Sirmpa
 Sirtaki (Syrtaki, Zorba)  (Greece)
 Sivas bar
 Skank (dance)
 Skip jive
 Skočná
 Slängpolska (Sweden, Folk, see Polska)
 Slip jig (Ireland)
 Slow dance
 Slow Foxtrot - also known as Foxtrot and Slowfox (Ballroom)
 Snoa
 Social dance
 Soke
 Sokkie
 Solomon Islands dance
 Son (Mayan, Guatemala/Mexico)
 Šopka
 Sōran Bushi
 Sousedská
 Sousta  (Greece)
 Špacírka
 Sperveri
 Springar
 Square dance
 Square dance (Modern western)
 Square dance (Traditional)
 Squat dance
 Stage diving
 Stamoulo
 Stanky Legg (GS Boys)
 Starotikveško
 Stave dancing
 Step dance (Ireland)
 Stiletto dance (American contemporary solo dance)
 Stomp dance
 Strathspey
 Street dance
 The Strictly (British television dance)
 Strip the willow
 Subli
 Suleiman Aga
 Sundanese dance
 Suscia
 Swing (both as family of dances and as specific Texas dance)
 Syrtos (Greece)
 Kalamatianos Syrtos (Mainland Syrtos)  (Greece)

T 

 Taepyeongmu
 Tahtib
 Tambor
 Tambourin (Provençal)
 Tamure
 Tamzara
 Tandava (India)
 Tanggai dance
 Tango (Argentina) (Ballroom, Social, Club)
 Argentine Tango - also known as Tango Argentino (Social)
 Uruguayan Tango - also known as Tango Uruguayo (Social)
 Ballroom Tango - competitive and social dance styles
 Brazilian Tango - see Maxixe
 Finnish tango
 Thirayattam (Indian Ethnic dance)
 Thiriyuzhichil
 Tanggai dance
 Tanoura (Egyptian dance)
 Tap Charleston (see Lindy Hop)
 Tap dance
 Tapeinos horos
 Tarakama
 Tarantella (Italian, folk)
 Tatsia
 Tau'olunga (Tongan or Samoan - Polynesian origins)
 Tautoga
 Ta Xila
 Tecktonik ("tck")
 Teke zortlatmasi
 Tello
 Temani (Israeli Jewish dance)
 Temuraga
 Tertali
 Teshkoto
 Texas Tommy (see Lindy Hop)
 Thabal chongba
 Thidambu Nritham
 Thirayattam
 Thirra
 The Thistle (Scottish ladies' solo step dance))
 Thomai
 Tiger dance
 Tinikling (Philippines)
 Time Warp
 Tinku (Bolivia, Peru)
 Tobas
 Tondero (Peru)
 Topeng dance
 Tourdion (historical)
 Toycular yarcan
 Toyi-toyi
 Traditional dance
 Tranky Doo (Swing, Line dance)
 Tranos Choros
 Trata  (Greece)
 Trepak (The Nutcracker) (Russian dance; character dance from the ballet The Nutcracker)
 Tropak (folk)
 Tresenica
 Tribal Style Belly Dance
 Tripuri dances
 Trizalis
 Troika (Folk, Russian, Cajun)
 Trojak
 Tromakton
 Tropanka
 Tropotianka
 Tsakonikos  (Greece)
 Tsamiko  (Greece)
 Tsestos
 Tsifteteli  (Tsifte-Teli) (Çifte-telli)  (Turkish) (Greece)(Romani)(Arabic)
 Tsiniaris
 Tufo
 Tumba francesa
 Tutsa Naga
 Tutting
 Twerking
 Twist
 Two-step
 Cajun Two Step
 Country/Western Two-step
 Nightclub two-step - also known as California Two-step, abbrn: NC2S
 Progressive Double Two
 Twoubadou (Haiti)
 Tyrolienne

U 

 Ukrainian dance
 Ula
 Ulek mayang
 'upa'upa, claimed to be the origin of merengue music and dance
 Uprock (as known as Rock Dance or Rocking)
 Ura
 Urban Dance
 Uzundara

V 

 Vallja e cobanit
 Valse à deux temps
 Van papuri
 Varsovienne
 Vayia Strose kai Louloudia
 Veeragase
 Veeranatyam
 Verbunkos
 Vesnianky
 Vintage dance
 Vira
 Virginia reel 
 Vlečenoto
 Vogue (dance)
 Volkspele
 Volta (dance)

W 

 Waacking
 Waka waka
 Waltz
 Cross-step waltz
 International standard waltz
 Peruvian waltz
 Venezuelan waltz
 Viennese waltz
 Wari
 Watusi (fad dance)
 Wayang wong
 West Coast Swing ("WCS"; Swing, United States)
 Western swing (United States)
 Sophisticated Swing (an older name of WCS)
 Western promenade dance
 Whirling
 Wilt Thou Go to the Barracks, Johnny?
 Winterguard
 Witches reel
 Wolosso (Ivory Coast)
 Worship dance

X 
 Xaxado
 Xibelani (traditional Shangaan (South Africa))

Y 

 Yablochko (Russian, folk)
 Yakshagana (Karnataka, India)
 Yangge
 Yarkhushta
 Yein
 Yingge dance
 YMCA
 Yosakoi (Japanese)
 Youz bir
 Yove male mome
 Yowlah (rifle dance from UAE
 Yup'ik dancing
 Yurukikos

Z 

 Zaharoula
 Zamacueca
 Zamba (Argentina)
 Zambra
 Zaouli
 Zapateado (Mexico)
 Zapateado (Spain)
 Zapin (Malay traditional dancing, Malaysia)
 Zarambeque
 Zaramo
 Zeybek dance
 Zeibekiko
 Zervodexios
 Zervos
 Zeybek dance
 Zonaradiko  (Thrace)
 Zorba's dance, another name for Sirtaki  (of Greek origin)
 Zouk (Guadeloupe, Martinique, Haiti, Brazil)
 Zouk-Lambada (Brazil)
 Zwiefacher (Germany)
 Zydeco (Louisiana, U.S.)

See also

 Index of dance articles
 Outline of dance, a list of general dance topics in our world today and from history.

Dances